Roman Ubakivi (born 24 March 1945) is an Estonian former football player and coach. He founded the youth team Lõvid for ethnic Estonian players and coached the Estonia national football team from 1994 to 1995. His former pupils include national team centurions Marko Kristal, Mart Poom and Martin Reim.

Honours

Player
Norma
 Estonian SSR Football Championship: 1970
 Estonian Cup: 1971, 1973

Manager
Flora
 Meistriliiga: 1993–94, 1994–95
 Estonian Cup: 1994–95

Individual
 5th Class Order of the Estonian Red Cross

References

1945 births
Living people
Footballers from Tallinn
Estonian football managers
Estonian footballers
FC Flora managers
Estonia national football team managers
Association football defenders
Soviet footballers
Soviet football managers
Estonian National Independence Party politicians
Tallinn University alumni